, or Detective Story, is an action Japanese TV series starring Yūsaku Matsuda that was originally broadcast on Nippon TV in 27 forty-five-minute episodes from September 18, 1979 to April 1, 1980. The show had various directors including Toru Murakawa, Kiyoshi Nishimura, Yukihiro Sawada and Yasuharu Hasebe.

Plot
Shunsaku Kudō sets up office in a rundown building as a private detective after spending five years as a cop in San Francisco where he became familiar with firearms. Kudō was originally envisioned as a standard hard-boiled type but star Yūsaku Matsuda looked too much like a rebel so the character ended up riding a Vespa scooter, smoking Camel cigarettes and dressing in a black or white suit and sunglasses. Also living in the building are two young girls (American actress Nancy Cheney and Kahori Takeda) who fuss over the detective.

Cast
 Yūsaku Matsuda as Shunsaku Kudo
 Mikio Narita as Chief Detective Hattori
 Mitsuko Baisho as Masako
 Michihiro Yamanishi as Detective Matsumoto
 Nancy Cheney as Nancy
 Kahori Takeda as Kahori
 Tetsuo Nose as Tattoo Guy
 Hiroshi Shimizu as Iizuka
 Osamu Shigematsu
 Yukiko Tachibana
 Ryoko Watanabe
 Hiromi Hirata

Reception
Tantei Monogatari with its easy-going humorous style earned high ratings while on the air and later acquired a cult following. Nippon TV published a book about the show titled Yomigaere! Tantei Monogatari (Come Back! Detective Story) in 1994 and Toei Video later released the whole series. Toei also released the entire series as a boxed set of Blu-ray discs in 2015.

References

External links

Japanese action television series
Japanese drama television series
Nippon TV dramas
Detective television series
1979 Japanese television series debuts
1980 Japanese television series endings
Japanese detective television drama series